Marilú Salazar (born 27 October 1965) is a Peruvian long-distance runner. She competed in the women's marathon at the 1996 Summer Olympics.

References

External links
 

1965 births
Living people
Athletes (track and field) at the 1995 Pan American Games
Athletes (track and field) at the 1996 Summer Olympics
Peruvian female long-distance runners
Peruvian female marathon runners
Olympic athletes of Peru
Place of birth missing (living people)
Pan American Games competitors for Peru
20th-century Peruvian women
21st-century Peruvian women